Julian Leow Beng Kim (born 3 January 1964) is a Malaysian prelate of the Roman Catholic Church who has been serving as archbishop of the Archdiocese of Kuala Lumpur since 2014.

Early life
Archbishop Leow was born on 3 January 1964, in Seremban, Negeri Sembilan to an ethnic Malaysian Chinese family of Cantonese descent. He obtained a Bachelor of Building from the University of New South Wales in Sydney, Australia in the year 1989. He then studied at College General, Penang from 1994 to 2001. He was ordained priest for the Archdiocese of Kuala Lumpur on 20 April 2002, by Most Rev Anthony Soter Fernandez (now Cardinal).

Archbishop Leow has also obtained a Licentiate in Church History from the Pontifical Gregorian University in Rome, Italy. He also served as the Dean of Studies and formator at College General, Penang from the year 2009 until his appointment as the Archbishop of Kuala Lumpur.

Appointment as Archbishop
On 3 July 2014, Pope Francis appointed Leow as the 4th Archbishop of Kuala Lumpur. He succeeds Archbishop Emeritus Murphy Pakiam, whose resignation was accepted by the Pope on 13 December 2013 upon the reaching the age limit of 75 according to the Canon Law.

Leow was consecrated and installed archbishop on 6 October 2014, in the presence of the Apostolic Nuncio to Malaysia, Archbishop Joseph Marino at the Church of the Holy Family in Kajang, Selangor. Some 12,000 came from around the country to witness the consecration. His principal consecrator was the Archbishop of Kuching, Most Rev. Dato' John Ha Tiong Hock. His co-consecrators were Archbishop Emeritus Murphy Pakiam and Archbishop Emeritus Anthony Soter Fernandez.

The motto for Leow's episcopacy is "Integrity and Tenderness".

Controversy erupted on the day of Leow's ordination to the episcopacy regarding the inclusion of a 'tree of all religions' in his episcopal coat of arms. An article published by conservative Roman Catholic news portal Rorate Caeli reported that a local group of Catholic faithful had been deeply scandalized by the symbol, which could be suggestive of the heresy of indifferentism.

See also
Archdiocese of Kuala Lumpur
College General

References

External links
 Catholic-Hierarchy.org
 Archdiocese of Kuala Lumpur
 Our Archbishop

Roman Catholic archbishops of Kuala Lumpur
21st-century Roman Catholic archbishops in Malaysia
Bishops appointed by Pope Francis
1964 births
Living people
People from Negeri Sembilan
Malaysian people of Chinese descent
Malaysian people of Cantonese descent
University of New South Wales alumni
Pontifical Gregorian University alumni